Ze'ev Binyamin "Benny" Begin, (born 1 March 1943) is an Israeli geologist and politician. He was a member of the Knesset for New Hope, having previously served as a member for Likud and Herut – The National Movement. He is the son of former Prime Minister of Israel Menachem Begin.

Biography
Ze'ev Binyamin (Benny) Begin was born in Jerusalem to Aliza and Menachem Begin. He studied geology at the Hebrew University of Jerusalem. After completing his undergraduate and graduate studies, he worked for the Geological Survey of Israel. He completed his doctorate in geology at Colorado State University in 1978.

Political career
First elected to the Knesset in 1988 as a Likud MK, Begin ran in the Likud leadership election in 1993 to succeed Yitzhak Shamir as party leader but was defeated by Benjamin Netanyahu. Under Netanyahu's government (1996–1999), Begin served as Science Minister until 1997 when he resigned in protest against the Hebron Agreement.

He subsequently led hardliners out of the Likud with the hope of reviving the Herut political party founded by his father. With full support from former Prime Minister Yitzhak Shamir, Herut – The National Movement departed from the Likud and joined other right-wing parties to form the National Union, an alliance opposing the Oslo Accords. Owing to the National Union's poor showing in the 1999 elections, Begin resigned his seat and quit politics. He resumed his career in science and education, and was appointed Director of the Geological Survey of Israel.

Begin announced on 2 November 2008 his return to politics and the Likud party, as well as his intention to seek a place on the Likud list for the 2009 elections. He ultimately won fifth place on the party's list, and returned to the Knesset with Likud winning 27 seats. Netanyahu had promised Begin a ministerial position if Likud won the election and honored that promise by appointing Begin a Minister without Portfolio in the new government.

Begin did not run in the 2013 elections, but returned to politics in the 2015 elections running on the 11th place on the Likud party list, the spot reserved for a candidate appointed by party leader Netanyahu. Following the elections, he was appointed Minister without Portfolio in the new government. His term with the government lasted only eleven days. After Prime Minister Netanyahu convinced Gilad Erdan to join the government as Minister of Public Security, Strategic Affairs and Public Diplomacy, Begin was forced to resign as Likud's coalition agreement limited the party to 13 ministers.

Benny Begin officially left Likud and joined Gideon Sa'ar's New Hope party on 21 January 2021. Begin was placed sixth on New Hope's list for the 2021 elections. He gained a seat in the 24th Knesset as New Hope won six seats.

Begin announced his retirement from politics on 28 July 2022 due to his age, but stated that he would campaign for the Blue and White–New Hope alliance during the 2022 election.

Views and opinions
In an interview with Haaretz in 2009, Begin explained his opposition to a Palestinian state, proposing instead an Arab autonomy under Israeli control, since "without security control in Samaria, Judea and Gaza there will be no security in Tel Aviv, either." He concluded with his belief that we must "live together with people who do not want us... [and] behave humanely and decently both with the Israeli citizens who are not Jews and with those who are not citizens. Is there a contradiction between my nationalism and my liberalism? I believe that this is a day-to-day effort to which I and he is obligated."

On 3 March 2019, Begin said that he was "deeply troubled" after reading the Israeli attorney general's 57-page document detailing the suspicions against Israeli Prime Minister Benjamin Netanyahu. Begin was one of the few members of the then-governing coalition to support the attorney general.

Personal life
Begin is married, and had six children. One son, Yonatan, was a fighter pilot with the Israeli Air Force who was killed when his F-16 fighter jet crashed in 2000. Another son,
Avinadav is a writer, and has become a social activist, out of a general anti-nationalist ideology. He was engaged in pro-Palestinian demonstrations.

References

External links

Thoughts of a National Liberal: an interview with Benny Begin - Fathom Journal

1943 births
Living people
Children of prime ministers of Israel
Colorado State University alumni
Hebrew University of Jerusalem alumni
Herut – The National Movement politicians
Israeli geologists
Israeli Jews
Jewish Israeli politicians
Jews in Mandatory Palestine
Leaders of political parties in Israel
Likud politicians
Members of the 12th Knesset (1988–1992)
Members of the 13th Knesset (1992–1996)
Members of the 14th Knesset (1996–1999)
Members of the 18th Knesset (2009–2013)
Members of the 20th Knesset (2015–2019)
Members of the 24th Knesset (2021–2022)
Ministers of Science of Israel
New Hope (Israel) politicians
Politicians from Jerusalem